Tambrauw Regency is a regency of Southwest Papua Province, Indonesia.

Geography
Tambrauw Regency is a new regency located in Bird's head region of Papua Island. Geographically, Tambrauw. Regency is located at 132035' East Longitude (East Longitude) – 134045' East Longitude (East Longitude) and 0015' South Latitude (South Latitude) - 3025' LS (South Latitude). Geographical position very strategic because it is located in the West – East movement of Papua Island and bordering sea waters is an international transportation route, so that the development of facilities and infrastructure for Tambrauw Regency in the future can take advantage of the opportunities of this strategic geographical position (egport development).

In 2010 its area covered 5,179.65 km2, and it had a population of just 6,145 at the 2010 Census. However, in 2013 the existing regency was expanded by the addition of four districts from Manokwari Regency (Kebar, Amberbaken, Mubarni/Arfu and Senopi) and by one district (Moraid) from Sorong Regency. The administrative centre lies at the village of Fef. The Regency now has an area of 11,529.18 km2, and it had a population of 28,379 at the 2020 Census; the official estimate as at mid 2021 was 31,385. It is served by Werur Airport.

Climatology
Tambrauw Regency has a humid tropical climate with rainfall ranging between 2,200 and 2,500 mm per year. The average annual rainfall is 110 mm with an average of 16 rainy days per month. The highest rainfall occurs in March reaching 337 mm, while the lowest rainfall occurred in August when it reaches 11 mm. The highest rainy day occurs in March, reaching 21 days, while the lowest rainy days occur in April, May and October when it reaches 13 days.

Languages
The language isolates Abun and Mpur are spoken in Tambrauw Regency. Moraid, Meyah, and other languages are also spoken in the regency.

History
In 2012, a famine and disease outbreak killed 95 people in Tambrauw Regency.

Administrative Districts
In 2010 the existing regency comprised seven districts, tabulated below with their areas and their populations at the 2010 Census, together with their estimated populations in mid 2013:

The four districts which were added from Manokwari Regency and the single district added from Sorong Regency in 2013 are tabulated below with their areas and their populations at the 2010 Census, together with their estimated populations in mid 2013:

Subsequent to 2013, seventeen further districts were subsequently created by the division of existing districts, and the total in the regency now comprises twenty-nine districts in all. The areas and populations at the 2020 Census of these districts are tabulated below. The table also includes the location of the district administrative centres, the number of administrative villages (desa and kelurahan) in each of these districts, and their post codes.

References

External links
Statistics publications from Statistics Indonesia (BPS)

  

 
Regencies of Southwest Papua
Populated coastal places in Indonesia
Populated places in Southwest Papua